Astraeus asiaticus is a species of false earthstar in the family Diplocystaceae. Described as a new species in 2007, it was originally found in north and northeastern areas of Thailand, where it grows in sandy or laterite-rich soil in dry lowland dipterocarp forests. The species has a wide distribution in Asia.

See also
Astraeus odoratus

References

External links

Boletales
Fungi described in 2007
Fungi of Asia